David Grimaldi may refer to:

 David Grimaldi (entomologist) (born 1957), American entomologist and curator
 David Grimaldi (soccer) (born 1954), retired American soccer defender
 David Grimaldi (politician) (born 1978), American businessman and politician